Raphael Claus (born 6 September 1979 in Santa Bárbara d'Oeste, Brazil) is a Brazilian football referee. He is nominated as an official referee list of 2022 FIFA World Cup in Qatar.

Professional
Raphael Claus currently represents the Federação Paulista de Futebol, and has been listed on the FIFA table since the beginning of 2015. He refereed in several international competitions, such as the 2021 Copa América and the 2019 FIFA U-20 World Cup.

References

1979 births
Brazilian football referees
Living people
Sportspeople from São Paulo
Copa América referees
2022 FIFA World Cup referees
21st-century Brazilian people